Gary Jeffries (born May 13, 1946) is the former head coach for Wilfrid Laurier University's football team, the Wilfrid Laurier Golden Hawks. He served as the team's head coach from 2002 to 2012, winning the CIS Coach of the Year award in 2003 and a Vanier Cup championship in 2005. Collegiately, he played CIAU football and hockey for the Guelph Gryphons and football for the Wilfrid Laurier Golden Hawks. Jeffries also played baseball in the Detroit Tigers organization from 1966-1969.

Coaching career
Jeffries began his coaching career in 1972 as the linebackers coach and defensive line coach for the Golden Hawks until his promotion to defensive coordinator in 1981. While serving as the defensive coordinator until 1988, he also served as the Golden Hawks women's basketball coach from 1984-1988. He became the men's basketball coach in 1989, holding that position until 1996, while also resigning from his football duties. In 1994, he re-joined the football team as their defensive coordinator and held that position until 2002, when he became the team's interim head coach midway through the season. He won the school's second ever Vanier Cup championship in 2005 against the Saskatchewan Huskies.

On November 1, 2012, it was announced that Jeffries was stepping down as manager of football operations and head coach.

Since 2013, he has been the special teams coordinator of the McMaster Marauders.

References

On Jan. 31, 2013 Jeffries joined the staff of the McMaster Marauders as the Special Teams Coordinator.

External links
Wilfrid Laurier Golden Hawks profile

1946 births
American women's basketball coaches
Canadian football defensive backs
Guelph Gryphons football players
Living people
Players of Canadian football from Ontario
Canadian football people from Toronto
Wilfrid Laurier Golden Hawks football players
McMaster Marauders football coaches
Wilfrid Laurier Golden Hawks football coaches